Open Field is the debut album by the Swedish solo act Taken By Trees. It is the first studio album to be released by Victoria Bergsman after shedding her duties as the lead singer of The Concretes. It was released on June 18, 2007 on Rough Trade Records.

Track listing 
All tracks written by Victoria Bergsman except where noted.
"Tell Me" – 3:38
"Julia" – 4:00
"The Legend" – 3:54
"Sunshine Lady" – 2:29
"Lost & Found" (Tracyanne Campbell) – 2:57
"Open Field" (Bergsman and Björn Yttling) – 3:17
"Hours Pass Like Centuries" – 1:51
"Too Young" – 4:30
"Only Yesterday" – 2:38
"Cedar Trees" – 5:11

Personnel

Performance
Victoria Bergsman – Vocals & various instruments
Björn Yttling – Bass, piano & guitar
John Eriksson – Drums, vibraphone, marimba, percussion & synth
Andreas Söderstrom – Guitar, mandolin & harmonium
Verity Susman – Piano & backing vocals
Nils Berg – Flute & synth
Elle-Kari Larsson – Backing vocals
Lykke Zachrisson – Backing vocals
Linda Portnoff – Backing vocals
Sofia Hogman – Backing vocals
Rebecka Hjukstrom – Backing vocals
Louise Holmer – Backing vocals
Eric Berglund – Zither
Mikael Andersson – Euphonium
Per Johansson – Various flutes
August Berg – Cymbals
Andreas Forsman – Violin
Erik Arvinder – Violin
Erik Holm – Viola
Anna Dager – Cello

Production

Production 

Björn Yttling and Victoria Bergsman

Recording 

Janne Hansson at Atlantis Studio

Lasse Mârtén at Decibel Studios

Björn Yttling at Högalid Studio

Mixing 

Lasse Mârtén and Björn Yitling at Decibel Studios

String Arrangements 

Björn Yttling

Mastering 

Henrik Jonsson and Björn Yttling at Masters of Audio

Paintings 

Victoria Bergsman

Graphic Design 

Olov Sundstrom

External links
Open Fields at Rough Trade

Taken by Trees albums
2007 albums